Vjačeslavs Fanduļs (born March 17, 1969, in Leningrad, Soviet Union) is a  Latvian former professional ice hockey forward.

Playing career
Fanduļs began his career with RASMS Riga before playing in the Soviet Hockey League for Dinamo Riga and Stars Riga between 1988 and 1992. He then moved to Finland's SM-liiga with spells at Ässät, HPK, TPS, and Kärpät between 1992 and 2001.

Fanduļs then moved to Germany's Deutsche Eishockey Liga and signed for the Berlin Capitals. He played just one season in the DEL before returning to Ässät. He later returned to Latvia and played for ASK/Ogre.

He also played for the Latvian national team He represented Latvia in the 2002 Winter Olympics

Career statistics

Regular season and playoffs

International

References

External links

1969 births
Living people
Soviet emigrants to Latvia
ASK/Ogre players
Ässät players
Berlin Capitals players
Dinamo Riga players
Frederikshavn White Hawks players
GCK Lions players
HPK players
Ice hockey players at the 2002 Winter Olympics
Latvian ice hockey centres
Olympic ice hockey players of Latvia
Oulun Kärpät players
Ice hockey people from Saint Petersburg
Soviet ice hockey players
HC TPS players
Traktor Chelyabinsk players
Vaasan Sport players